Barreda may refer to:

People:
 Fabiana Barreda (born 1967), Argentine artist
Francisco de Sánchez de la Barreda (died 1738), governor of Chile in 1734
 Gabino Barreda (1818–1881), Mexican physician and philosopher
 Joan Barreda (born 1983), Spanish motorcycle racer
 José María Barreda (born 1953), Spanish politician
 José Pardo y Barreda (1864–1947), President of Peru from 1904 to 1908 and 1915 to 1919
 Octavio G. Barreda (1897–1964), Mexican poet, critic, and essayist
 Ricardo Barreda (1936–2020), Argentine mass murderer
 Sergio Barreda (1951–2002), Peruvian surfer

Places:
 Barreda, a subdivision of the municipality of Torrelavega, Spain

Organizations
 SD Barreda Balompié, a football team based in Barreda